Outside the Box may refer to:

Outside the box, a metaphor about thinking unconventionally
Outside the Box (festival), an annual music and arts festival in Boston, Massachusetts, US
Outside the Box (Hacktivist album), 2016
Outside the Box (Skream album), 2010
Outside the Box (Vicki Genfan album), 2000
Outside the Box Comedy Club, a comedy club in Kingston upon Thames, London

See also
Out of the box (disambiguation)